Timur Zakirov may refer to:

 Timur Zakirov (footballer, born 1970), Russian football player
 Timur Zakirov (footballer, born 1996), Russian football player